The Republican Guard Brigade ( | Liwāʾ al-Ḥaras al-ǧumhūrī), also known as the Presidential Guard Brigade, is a unit of the Land Component of the Lebanese Armed Forces (LAF), attached to the Directorate-General of the Presidency of Lebanon.

Insignia
The insignia of the Presidential Guard Brigade consists of:

 The Lebanese flag in the form of a shield.
‌‌ A wreath composed of two fronds of laurel and oak leaves.
‌‌ Two crossed swords.

 The background of the insignia is a shield colored navy blue.
‌The Lebanese flag is in the middle of the insignia, the two swords in its background, the wreath surrounding it.
above it are inscribed the words "Republican Guard".

Structure and organization
The brigade comprises a 1st Battalion, 2nd Battalion, a Support Battalion, and a Logistics Battalion. The brigade was established on May 14, 1984 and was stationed in Baabda. Up until 1949, the Lebanese Republican Guard Brigade was called the Dragon brigade. The commander in 2005 was Brigadier General Mustafa Hamdan, who was accused of complicity in the assassination of former Lebanese Prime Minister Rafik Hariri in February 2005 and later released from prison without being cleared as innocent along with three other generals in April 2009. When President Lahoud stepped down at the end of his office, the brigade was reattached to the Army General Command.

Role 

The brigade's duties include providing escorts not only for the Lebanese President and its family, but also to the Prime-Minister and cabinet members or to foreign visiting heads-of-state, and guards-of-honour at official public acts.  They are also entrusted with guarding important public buildings in Beirut such as the Parliament House at Nejmeh Square and the nearby Grand Serail, an Ottoman-era palatial complex which houses the Prime-Minister and the Council of Ministers' offices, and the Presidential Palace itself.

See also
 Army of Free Lebanon
 Lebanese Arab Army
 Lebanese Armed Forces
 Lebanese Civil War
 Internal Security Forces
 Weapons of the Lebanese Civil War
 Zgharta Liberation Army
 2nd Infantry Brigade (Lebanon)
 3rd Infantry Brigade (Lebanon)
 5th Infantry Brigade (Lebanon)
 6th Infantry Brigade (Lebanon)
 7th Infantry Brigade (Lebanon)
 8th Infantry Brigade (Lebanon)
 9th Infantry Brigade (Lebanon)
 1958 Lebanon crisis

References

External links
Lebanese Republican Guard official page

Guards regiments
Military units and formations of Lebanon
Protective security units
1984 establishments in Lebanon
Guards of honour